5008 may refer to:

 5008 Miyazawakenji, a minor planet
 DIN 5008, German national standard DIN 5008 by Deutsches Institut für Normung (DIN) specifies writing and layout rules for word processing
 MicroRNA 5008, a protein
 Peugeot 5008, a 2009–present French compact MPV and SUV
 Zotye 2008, a 2005–2016 Chinese subcompact SUV, also sold as Zotye 5008